Kevin Kelly or Kelley may refer to:

Entertainment
 Kevin Kelly (publisher) (born 1937), Irish publisher and editor
 Kevin Kelly (editor) (born 1952), editor of Wired magazine and former editor of Whole Earth Catalog
 Kevin Kelley (musician) (1943–2002), American drummer for the Rising Sons and The Byrds
 Kevin Kelly (announcer) (born 1967), American wrestling announcer and manager

Politics
 Kevin Kelly (politician) (born 1953), American politician from Maryland
 Kevin C. Kelly, member of the Connecticut Senate
 Kevin J. Kelley, President of Cleveland City Council

Sports
 Kevin Kelley (American football), American high school and college football coach
 Kevin Kelley (boxer) (born 1967), American boxer
 Kevin Kelly (boxer) (born 1969), Australian boxer
 Kevin Kelly (coach) (born c. 1960), American college football coach
 Kevin Kelly (pitcher, born 1990) (born 1983), Dutch baseball player
 Kevin Kelly (pitcher, born 1997) (born 1997), American baseball player
 Kevin Kelly (placekicker) (born 1987), American college football placekicker
 Kevin Kelly (hurler) (born 1993), Irish hurler
 Kevin Wacholz (born 1958), American professional wrestler also known as Kevin Kelly

Other
 Kevin T. Kelly (1933–2018), British Roman Catholic priest and moral theologian
 L. Kevin Kelly, (born c. 1965), Chief Executive Officer of Heidrick & Struggles